WFRW may refer to:

 WFRW-LD, a low-power television station (channel 41) licensed to serve Enterprise, Alabama, United States
 WLXJ, a radio station (88.9 FM) licensed to serve Battle Ground, Indiana, United States, which held the call sign WFRW from 2014 to 2016
 WKEL (FM), a radio station (88.1 FM) licensed to serve Webster, New York, United States